OBX may refer to:

 OBX Index, the benchmark index of the Oslo Stock Exchange
 Outer Banks, a stretch of North Carolina coastline
 Outer Banks (TV series), an action-adventure TV series set on the North Carolina coast
 Oberheim OB-X, a polyphonic analog synthesizer
 OBX, IATA airport code of Obo Airport (Papua New Guinea)